Albert Horton may refer to:

 Albert Clinton Horton (1798–1865), Lieutenant Governor of Texas
 Albert H. Horton (1837–1902), Chief Justice of the Kansas Supreme Court

See also
 Albert Norton